John Cartwright (born 9 August 1965) is the assistant coach of the Brisbane Broncos in the NRL and an Australian former professional rugby league footballer and former head coach. He was the head coach for the Gold Coast Titans. A "strong running and skilful passing" Australian international and New South Wales State of Origin representative second-row forward, Cartwright played his club football with the Penrith Panthers, winning the 1991 premiership with them.

Playing career
Cartwright began with Penrith in 1985 and was a regular first-grade player by 1987.

In 1988, under the guidance of Ron Willey, Penrith developed a heavyweight, aggressive forward pack of which Cartwright and second row partner Mark Geyer were the cornerstones.

Cartwright had a sudden rise through representative ranks in 1989. Initially not chosen for the City Origin team, he took his place in the firsts team after a spate of injuries. John was the named on the bench for New South Wales for the first State of Origin match. Unfortunately, a late injury to Ian Roberts forced him to play in the front row, to which John was ill-suited, and John was dropped after one match. At the end of the year, John was sent off against Balmain and suspended for four matches. Penrith were thrashed 33-6 and could not win either of their two finals without  John Cartwright. On returning from suspension,  John Cartwright found form very quickly and at the end of the 1990 NSWRL season, John went on the 1990 Kangaroo tour of Great Britain and France but was dropped after one Test.

Injury affected Cartwright in 1991, and  Cartwright was used as a reserve in two of the three Tests against New Zealand. Following the 1991 grand final victory , Cartwright travelled with the Penrith club to England for the 1991 World Club Challenge which was lost to Wigan.

Cartwright had his finest season of all in 1992. During the 1992 Great Britain Lions tour of Australia and New Zealand,  Cartwright helped Australia retain The Ashes. John played in all three games for New South Wales (scoring a rare try in the third) and took over the Penrith captaincy when Greg Alexander was injured.

At the end of 1996, Cartwright left Penrith to play in England.

Coaching career
After he finally retired as a player, John Cartwright became an assistant coach at the Penrith club and the Sydney Roosters. In 2000 he was awarded the Australian Sports Medal for his contribution to Australia's international standing in rugby league. 

Cartwright began coaching at Penrith as the reserve coach in 2001. After a period as assistant to Ricky Stuart at the Sydney Roosters, as well as coaching the United States national rugby league team against the Kangaroos in 2004, Cartwright was appointed the inaugural coach of the Gold Coast Titans after their admission to the National Rugby League.

He became involved in a feud with Melbourne Storm winger Steve Turner over contractual obligations. "We flew him up, showed him around for two or three days and he agreed to me that he would come here, we shook hands. He looked me in the eye. The deal was done. He even started looking for accommodation. I only coached him in a couple of games at Penrith and my reaction has been the same as it would be for any player in this situation. But to do what he has done . . . I'm not happy. I'm extremely disappointed, to say the least." 

In 2009, he was selected to coach the NSW Country Origin side.  He later guided to the Gold Coast to consecutive finals appearances in the 2009 NRL season and the 2010 NRL season, the latter of which saw the Gold Coast reach the preliminary final.  In 2011, the Gold Coast claimed their first Wooden Spoon under Cartwright's coaching.

After four years without making the finals, on 5 August 2014 he announced that he would stand down as head coach of the Gold Coast, with immediate effect. He would coach the club one last time against the Sydney Roosters in Round 22 before Neil Henry taking over on an interim basis.

In February 2015, Cartwright joined the North Queensland Cowboys as an assistant to head coach Paul Green.

On 4 October 2015,  John Cartwright was a member of North Queensland's coaching staff in the side's 17-16 Grand Final victory over the Brisbane Broncos.

In the weeks following the Grand Final win, Cartwright quit the North Queensland club and returned to Sydney as an assistant coach of the Manly-Warringah Sea Eagles.

Following the 2020 NRL season, Cartwright was announced as an assistant coach for the Brisbane Broncos, working under their new head coach Kevin Walters.

Personal life
Cartwright is the uncle of former Gold Coast Titans and Penrith Panthers Bryce Cartwright. Cartwright's son is Jed Cartwright who plays for South Sydney.

In 2020, Cartwright was a special guest on the Andy Raymond #UNFILTERED podcast!.

References

Footnotes

External links
Reds gain Titan support

1965 births
Living people
Australia national rugby league team players
Australian rugby league coaches
Australian rugby league players
Gold Coast Titans coaches
New South Wales City Origin rugby league team coaches
New South Wales City Origin rugby league team players
New South Wales Rugby League State of Origin players
Penrith Panthers players
Penrith Panthers captains
Recipients of the Australian Sports Medal
Rugby league players from Penrith, New South Wales
Rugby league second-rows
Salford Red Devils players
United States national rugby league team coaches